Laila in Haifa is a 2020 Israeli-French drama film directed by Amos Gitai. It was selected to be shown in the main competition section of the 77th Venice International Film Festival.

Cast

References

External links
 
 

2020 films
2020 drama films
Israeli drama films
French drama films
2020s Hebrew-language films
2020s Arabic-language films
Films directed by Amos Gitai
Films set in music venues
Israeli–Palestinian conflict films
Films set in Haifa
2020 multilingual films
French multilingual films
Israeli multilingual films
2020s French films